Mary Dorothy George (1878–1971), née Gordon, was a British historian best known for compiling the last seven volumes of the Catalogue of Political and Personal Satires Preserved in the Department of Prints and Drawings in the British Museum, the primary reference work for the study of British satirical prints of the eighteenth and nineteenth centuries.

Education 
Educated at Cambridge University she graduated in 1899 with a first class degree in History. During the first World War she worked in British Intelligence for MI5; before returning to academia as a research scholar at the London School of Economics.

Work at British Museum 
George's work on the  BM Satires, begun in 1930 on the invitation of the Museum Trustees, was a massive work of great scholarship that systematised a large corpus of previously undocumented  source material and recorded its complex historical context. Her work covered over 13,000 prints from the "golden age" of British satirical printmaking and its leading artists such as Matthew Darly, James Sayers, Robert Dighton,  James Gillray, Thomas Rowlandson, Isaac Cruikshank, Richard Newton. Charles Williams, William Heath, Isaac Robert Cruikshank and George Cruikshank, and many others.  The catalogue entries were scanned as part of the British Museum's ongoing digitalisation project of its collections  and provide the basis for many of the  entries on the  British Museum on-line catalogue.

Bibliography

See also
 Catalogue of Political and Personal Satires Preserved in the Department of Prints and Drawings in the British Museum
 List of historians

References

External links
   Portrait photograph of Mary Dorothy George in the National Portrait Gallery, London
    British Museum online collections 

1870 births
1971 deaths
British historians
British women historians
Alumni of Girton College, Cambridge
Alumni of the London School of Economics
People associated with the British Museum
Academics from London
20th-century English people